The Proto-Philippine language is a reconstructed ancestral proto-language of the Philippine languages, a proposed subgroup of the Austronesian languages which includes all languages within the Philippines (except for the Sama–Bajaw languages) as well as those within the northern portions of Sulawesi in Indonesia. Proto-Philippine is not directly attested to in any written work, but linguistic reconstruction by the comparative method has found regular similarities among languages that cannot be explained by coincidence or word-borrowing.

Classification

There have been three initial proposals in delineating the southern boundaries of the Philippine group: Northern Borneo in Malaysia, southern Philippines (encompassing southern Luzon all the way to Mindanao and the Sulu Sea area), and northern Sulawesi in Indonesia. The earliest boundary was proposed by Esser (1938) between the Gorontalo languages and the Tomini languages of Sulawesi. While it was later found decades after (Himmelmann, 1990) that there are shared innovations between Philippine and Tomini languages, there are still uncertainties as to whether the latter do validly form one genetic group, or should be relegated as a mere geographic unit. Meanwhile, Charles (1974) in particular proposed that languages in Sabah and of northern Sarawak are descendants of this Proto-Philippines, which has subsequently garnered counter-evidences (Blust, 1974; Reid, 1982; Zorc, 1986). Lastly, there have been several proposals establishing southern Philippines as the boundary (Thomas & Healey, 1962; Dyen, 1965; Zorc, 1977; 1986) with the "Macro Meso-Philippine" and "Sangiric" as two primary branches. Walton (1979) and McFarland (1980) included the Sama-Bajau group as the third branch, but such has been later disputed as entirely separate directly under Malayo-Polynesian.

Features

Due to issues in the validity of a Philippine genetic group, and thus the existence of an ancestral Proto-Philippines language, most of its features particularly its phonology remain as proposals.

Phonology

Llamzon's reconstruction 
Llamzon's (1975) proposed phonology of Proto-Philippines was derived from earlier reconstructions of Dempwolff's (1934-1938) works by Dyen (1947; 1951; 1953a; 1953b; 1953c). Used in this reconstruction were nine languages—Tagalog, Cebuano, Hiligaynon, Waray, Bikol (Central?), Ilokano, Ibanag, Ifugao, and Kankanaey—with the rationale that the aforementioned have "relatively better structural description and vocabularies" than other related and geographically contiguous languages at that time. While his analysis focused on attested Proto-Austronesian phonemes which were retained in this Proto-Philippines, features that were lost or merged were not highlighted.

Proto-phonemes *Z and *D were restricted to medial positions, and were not retained in any of the languages.

The proto-phonemes *j and *R are not preserved as such in any Philippine language: *j became either *g or *d (e.g. *púsəj became Ilocano púsəg, Tagalog púsod), whereas *R shifted to *r (e.g. in Ilokano), *l (e.g. in Pangasinan), *g (e.g. in Tagalog) or *y (e.g. in Kapampangan).

Proto-Philippines schwa *ə often merged with other vowels (e.g. /u/ in Cebuano, Hiligaynon, Waray; /a/ in Ibanag, /i/ in Tagalog), but is retained in a diverse range of Philippine languages (e.g. Gaddang, Kinaray-a, Maranao, Maguindanao, Rinconada Bikol, Palawano), and in southern dialects of Ilokano.

Paz' reconstruction 
Another notable proposal is by Paz (1981) who conducted a bottom-up approach by reconstructing using her own symbols.

Paz revisits two types of proto-Austronesian L as part of her reconstruction (l, l̥), which makes it distinct from other reconstructions.

In comparison to Llamzon, Paz presents five diphthongs instead.

Lexicon
Below is a table comparing core vocabulary from modern Philippine languages in relation to the follow Proto-Philippine innovations. Note that the accented vowels (e.g. á) under Proto-Philippine indicate the stress, while q represents glottal stop.

Below are selected animal and plant names in Proto-Philippine from the Austronesian Comparative Dictionary.

Animal names
{| class="wikitable sortable"
! No. !! Common name !! Scientific name !! Proto-Philippine
|-
| 9207 || fish sp., slipmouth || Leiognathus sp. || *sapsáp
|-
| 10806 || kind of mackerel || Rastrelliger spp. || *tuliŋan
|-
| 10964 || a sea fish, the rudderfish || Kyphosus cinerascens || *hilek
|-
| 1631 || anchovy || Stolephorus spp. || *bulínaw
|-
| 12682 || milkfish || Chanos chanos || *baŋús
|-
| 11877 || parrot fish || Scarus spp. || *mulmúl
|-
| 9819 || kind of water bird, the Oriental darter || Anhinga melanogaster || *kasíli
|-
| 10671 || a bird and its call, probably the tailor bird || Orthotomus atrogularis || *tiwtiw
|-
| 11077 || coconut crab || Birgus latro || *tatus
|-
| 12348 || large marine mollusk || Turbo marmoratus || *RaRaŋ
|}

Plant names
{| class="wikitable sortable"
! No. !! Common name !! Scientific name !! Proto-Philippine
|-
| 9369 || a flowering plant || Ixora spp. || *santán
|-
| 9568 || a fruit tree, the pomelo || Citrus decumana || *suháq
|-
| 2940 || a leguminous shrub || Leucaena glauca || *ipil ipil
|-
| 8957 || a palm || Corypha spp. || *silaR
|-
| 12394 || a plant || Acalypha spp. || *abilus
|-
| 10807 || a plant || Astronia spp., Melastomataceae || *tuŋaw₂
|-
| 11068 || a plant || Glochidion spp. || *anam
|-
| 9810 || a plant || Impatiens balsamina || *kamantigi
|-
| 6876 || a plant || Lunasia amara || *paqit-an
|-
| 10007 || a plant || Sesbania grandiflora || *katúday
|-
| 9565 || a plant || Solanum spp. || *sili-sili
|-
| 10064 || a plant in the banana family || Musa textilis? || *qaRutay
|-
| 12593 || a plant with medicinal value, probably || Blumea spp. || *qalibun
|-
| 11080 || a shrub or tree || Melanolepis multiglandulosa || *álem
|-
| 9651 || a shrub, the Jew's mallow || Corchorus spp., fam. Malvaceae || *salúyut
|-
| 12668 || a small tree with leaves used as medicine || Citrus aurantifolia || *dayap
|-
| 10265 || a tall tree || Parkia spp. || *kúpaŋ
|-
| 7998 || a tree || Acalypha amentacea || *beRus
|-
| 12362 || a tree || Diospyros sp. || *kanadem
|-
| 947 || a tree || Diospyros spp. || *talaŋ₁
|-
| 9647 || a tree || Erythrina spp. || *sabaŋ₂
|-
| 10966 || a tree || Ficus sp. || *lab(e)nuR
|-
| 10563 || a tree || Ficus sp. || *tebéR
|-
| 11024 || a tree || Ganua obovatifolia, Sapotaceae || *piaŋa
|-
| 608 || a tree || Lagerstroemia speciosa || *banabá
|-
| 11756 || a tree || Mallotus lackeyi || *lamay
|-
| 12325 || a tree || Myristica spp. || *lagu₂
|-
| 9093 || a tree || Planchonella obovata || *banisah
|-
| 9092 || a tree || Pongamia spp. || *bani₂
|-
| 10722 || a tree || Prunus sp. || *taŋa₄
|-
| 12392 || a tree || Shorea polysperma || *taŋíliq
|-
| 11555 || a tree and its fruit, the Java plum || Syzygium cumini || *luŋ(e)búy
|-
| 12198 || a tree with bark that can be used as a shampoo || Ganophyllum falcatum || *gúguq
|-
| 12228 || a tree with edible fruit || Diplodiscus paniculatus || *baRubu
|-
| 1208 || a tree; || Macaranga tanarius || *binuŋa
|-
| 12434 || a vine || Caesalpinia bonduc || *kabit₃
|-
| 10233 || a vine with gourd or cucumber-like fruit || Luffa sp.? || *kabatíti
|-
| 11595 || a vine with red flower clusters, the Chinese honeysuckle || Quisqualis indica || *taluluŋ
|-
| 12477 || an edible plant, swamp cabbage || Ipomoea aquatica || *taŋkuŋ
|-
| 11071 || beautyberry || Callicarpa spp. || *anayup
|-
| 11088 || creeping vine that grows on sandy beaches, the beach morning glory || Ipomoea pes-caprae || *balinu
|-
| 11148 || hairy eggplant || Solanum ferox || *basula
|-
| 10234 || kind of aromatic herb || Pogostemon cablin || *kab(e)liŋ
|-
| 9922 || kind of ebony or persimmon tree with fruits that are pounded and used to stupefy fish || Diospyros spp. || *kanúmay
|-
| 10312 || kind of edible squash or gourd || Lagenaria leucantha || *tabayaR
|-
| 11075 || kind of tall grass || Themeda gigantea || *taŋ(e)laj
|-
| 9750 || kind of wild lemon tree, possibly || Citrus hystrix || *kabuRaw
|-
| 9806 || large forest tree with edible brown, hairy fruits || Diospyros discolor || *kamaguŋ
|-
| 10412 || lesser yam || Dioscorea sp. || *tugíq
|-
| 10885 || lima bean || Phaseolus lunatus || *patániq
|-
| 2 || Manila hemp || Musa textilis || *abaká
|-
| 11872 || mountain apple || Eugenia spp. || *makúpa
|-
| 12657 || native spinach || Amaranthus spp. || *kulitis
|-
| 11653 || Philippine cedar tree || Cedrela sp. || *kalantas
|-
| 10749 || plant with leaves used as a vegetable || Talinum paniculatum or Talinum triangulare || *talínum
|-
| 1854 || silk cotton tree || Ceiba pentandra || *buybuy
|-
| 11145 || small tree || Morinda citrifolia? || *apatut
|-
| 12468 || taro || Colocasia esculenta || *gabi
|-
| 10978 || the almasiga tree || Agathis celebica || *gala
|-
| 11073 || the castor bean plant || Ricinus communis || *katana
|-
| 10163 || the horseradish tree || Moringa oleifera || *maruŋgay
|-
| 12753 || the Philippine mahogany || Shorea or Hopea sp. || *yakál
|-
| 9615 || the sappan tree || Caesalpinia sappan || *sibukaw
|-
| 12361 || the seeded breadfruit tree || Artocarpus camansi || *kamansi
|-
| 12253 || the seeded breadfruit tree || Artocarpus camansi || *kamansiq
|-
| 10762 || tree with bright yellow fruit that has dry flesh || Lucuma nervosa || *tisaq
|-
| 8970 || wild palm tree with fruit similar to areca nut || Heterospathe elata || *sagisí
|}

See also
Proto-Austronesian language
Proto-Malayo-Polynesian language
Proto-Oceanic language
Proto-Polynesian language
Philippine languages
Philippine Negrito languages
Austronesian languages

References

Further reading
Paz, Consuelo J. The Application of the Comparative Method to Philippine Languages
Liao, Hsiu-chuan. On the Development of Comitative Verbs in Philippine Languages, Language and Linguistics, 2011.

External links
Philippine etyma file cards by R. David Zorc

Philippine
Languages of the Philippines